Hyperbaeninae is a subfamily of Orthopterans, sometimes known as 'leaf-folding crickets' in the family Gryllacrididae; Hyperbaenus ensifer is the type species. The known distribution includes tropical: central and southern America, Africa and mainland Asia to Australasia.

Tribes & Genera
Following Cadena-Castañeda's (2019) review, the Orthoptera Species File lists five tribes:

Asarcogryllacridini 
Auth.: Cadena-Castañeda, 2019 - distribution: SE Asia
 Asarcogryllacris Karny, 1937
 Dialarnaca Gorochov, 2005
 Zalarnaca Gorochov, 2005

Capnogryllacridini 
Auth.: Cadena-Castañeda, 2019 - distribution: India, SE Asia
 Capnogryllacris Karny, 1937
 Diaphanogryllacris Karny, 1937
 Dictyogryllacris Karny, 1937
 Ultragryllacris Gorochov & Dawwrueng, 2015
 Woznessenskia Gorochov, 2002

Hyperbaenini 
Auth.: Cadena-Castañeda, 2019 - S. America
 Dibelona Brunner von Wattenwyl, 1888
 Hyperbaenus Brunner von Wattenwyl, 1888 – type genus
 Mikrohyperbaenus Cadena-Castañeda, 2021

Paragryllacridini 
Auth.: Cadena-Castañeda, 2019 - Australia, W Africa
 Acanthogryllacris Karny, 1937
 Bothriogryllacris Rentz, 1983
 Chauliogryllacris Rentz, 1990
 Craspedogryllacris Karny, 1937
 Hadrogryllacris Karny, 1937
 Mooracra Rentz, 1990
 Paragryllacris Brunner von Wattenwyl, 1888
 Pterapotrechus Karny, 1937
 Urogryllacris Rentz, 1997

Phryganogryllacridini 
Auth.: Cadena-Castañeda, 2019 - pantropical
 Aancistroger Bey-Bienko, 1957
 Abelona Karny, 1937
 Afroepacra Griffini, 1912
 Afrogryllacris Karny, 1937
 Claudiagryllacris Cadena-Castañeda, 2019
 Echidnogryllacris Griffini, 1912
 Epacra Brunner von Wattenwyl, 1888
 Glenogryllacris Karny, 1930
 Heterogryllacris Karny, 1937
 Hyalogryllacris Karny, 1937
 Nullanullia Rentz, 1990
 Nunkeria Rentz, 1990
 Papuogryllacris Griffini, 1909
 Phryganogryllacris Karny, 1937 - India, SE Asia
 Pissodogryllacris Karny, 1937
 Plexigryllacris Ingrisch, 2018
 Psilogryllacris Karny, 1937
 Siamgryllacris Ingrisch, 2018

References

External links

Orthoptera subfamilies
Gryllacrididae
Orthoptera of Asia
Orthoptera of Africa